Sauzovo (Sawıź) is a rural locality (a village) in Sauzbashevsky Selsoviet, Krasnokamsky District, Bashkortostan, Russia. The population was 165 as of 2010. There are 10 streets.

Geography 
Sauzovo is located 60 km southwest of Nikolo-Beryozovka (the district's administrative centre) by road. Novokabanovo is the nearest rural locality.

References 

Rural localities in Krasnokamsky District